Napoleon's Campaigns: 1813 & 1815 is a 1981 video game published by Strategic Simulations.

Gameplay
Napoleon's Campaigns: 1813 & 1815 is a game in which scenarios based on the Battle of Leipzig and Battle of Waterloo are included.

Reception
Daniel Weitz reviewed the game for Computer Gaming World, and stated that "This game is a must for anyone interested in the problems of army-level command or Napoleonic simulations. If Napoleon had an Apple and this game at Leipzig, he would have seen the handwriting on the screen and headed for the Rhine, kicking his aides-de-camp all the way."

Reviews
Computer Gaming World - Oct, 1990
Softalk reviews
1984 Software Encyclopedia from Electronic Games

References

External links
Review in Creative Computing

1981 video games
Apple II games
Apple II-only games
Computer wargames
Napoleonic Wars video games
Strategic Simulations games
Turn-based strategy video games
Video games developed in the United States